Frost Bank is a Texas-chartered bank based in San Antonio with 155 branches and 1,700 automated teller machines, all of which are in Texas. It is the primary subsidiary of Cullen/Frost Bankers, Inc., a bank holding company. It is on the list of largest banks in the United States.

History

Early years
Frost Bank was founded in 1868 as a mercantile partnership in San Antonio by Thomas Claiborne Frost, who had served as a lieutenant colonel in the Confederate States Army. In February 1899, it was chartered as a national banking association. That year, the bank also reached $1 million in deposits.(Worth about $35,216,385.54 with modern day inflation) The bank survived the Panic of 1907 with the aid of an association of local banks and by 1921, sold shares to outside investors for the first time. Frost continued to grow with construction of a 12-story building in 1921, which was the tallest building in Texas at the time. By 1926, Joseph Hardin Frost, brother of T.C. Frost Jr., took over as president of the company.

Growth
Over the years, Frost has grown both organically and through acquisition of other banks, beginning in 1928 with the purchase of Lockwood National Bank.  In 1977, the company merged with Cullen Bankers, Inc. of Houston forming Cullen/Frost Bankers, Inc. and its stock began trading on the NASDAQ.

In 1982, Cullen/Frost Bankers and United States National Bancshares, Inc. (USNB) of Galveston, Texas merged, but Frost operated USNB separately for nearly two decades. As new financial services legislation allowed banks to broaden the services they offered customers, Cullen/Frost folded the USNB charter into Frost's in 2000.  With this action, the last bank using the federally forbidden United States National Bank title ceased to exist.

In 1983, the bank announced it intended to merge into First City Bancorp of Houston, Texas, however the merger was never completed. First City was subsequently rescued by the FDIC in 1988 and ultimately bankrupted in 1992 and was absorbed by other banks, primarily Texas Commerce Bank (now Chase).

In 1999, Frost Bank acquired Commerce Financial Corp. and Frost Insurance Agency, a subsidiary of the bank acquired Professional Insurance Agents Inc.

In 2005-2006, the company acquired Alamo Bank of Texas, Horizon Capital Bank, Summit Bancshares Inc., and Texas Community Bank. In 2014, it acquired Western National Bank.

Industry changes

During the financial crisis of 2007–2008, the bank did not accept government assistance via the Troubled Asset Relief Program, but faced with changes in the financial services industry, the bank converted its 113-year-old federal charter into a state charter in June 2012.

References

External links
 Interview with Tom Frost, April 14, 1994, University of Texas as San Antonio: Institute of Texan Cultures: Oral History Collections, UA 15.01, University of Texas at San Antonio Libraries Special Collections.

1868 establishments in Texas
Banks based in Texas
American companies established in 1868
Banks established in 1868
Companies based in San Antonio
Companies listed on the New York Stock Exchange